The A6 highway is a highway in Lithuania (Magistralinis kelias). It runs from Kaunas to the Latvian border near Zarasai. From there, the road continues to Daugavpils as A13. The length of the road is 185.40 km.

The speed limit for most of the length of A6 is default 70–90 km/h (outside city limits) with few urban sections with default 30–50 km/h speed limit. The section from Kaunas to Jonava has been upgraded to a dual carriageway with at-grade junctions, at-grade pedestrian crossing points, U-turns and traffic-lights. The remaining sections are roads with one lane in each direction, leading through towns like Ukmergė, Utena and Zarasai.

This route is a part of International E-road network (part of European route E262).

Roads in Lithuania
Transport in Jonava
Transport in Kaunas
Ukmergė
Utena County
Zarasai